The 1959 Denver Pioneers football team was an American football team that represented the University of Denver as a member of the Skyline Conference during the 1959 NCAA University Division football season. In their fifth season under head coach John Roning, the Pioneers compiled a 2–8 record (2–5 against conference opponents), tied for fifth place in the Skyline, and were outscored by a total of 230 to 104.

Schedule

References

Denver
Denver Pioneers football seasons
Denver Pioneers football